The Tasmanian Government is the democratic administrative authority of the state of Tasmania, Australia. The leader of the party or coalition with the confidence of the House of Assembly, the lower house of the Parliament of Tasmania, is invited by the governor of Tasmania to form government. The head of government is the premier of Tasmania.

Since 8 April 2022, the premier of Tasmania has been Jeremy Rockliff, leader of the Liberal Party. The current ministry of Tasmania is the Rockliff ministry, formed on 8 April 2022 and comprising eight of the 13 Liberal members in the House of Assembly and one of the four in the Legislative Council.

Constitutional framework
Tasmania is governed according to the principles of the Westminster system, a form of parliamentary responsible government based on the model of the United Kingdom. Legislative power rests with the bicameral Parliament of Tasmania, which consists of the governor of Tasmania (the sovereign), and the two chambers: the Legislative Council and the House of Assembly.

Executive power rests formally with the Executive Council, which consists of the governor and senior ministers, and informally called the Cabinet. In practice, executive power is exercised by the premier of Tasmania upon the advice of the Cabinet, who are appointed by the governor, but who hold office by virtue of their ability to command the support of a majority of members of the House of Assembly.

Judicial power is exercised by the Supreme Court of Tasmania and a system of subordinate courts. As with all states, upon federation, Tasmania accepted the authority of the federal High Court of Australia to overrule the state judiciary.

Current ministry

Tasmanian government agencies

The Tasmanian Government delivers services, determines policy, and issues regulations through a number of agencies grouped under areas of portfolio responsibility. Each portfolio is led by a Secretary, who reports to one or more government ministers, a member of Parliament.  there are eight government departments:
 Department of Education
Department of Health
 Department of Justice
 Department of Police, Fire and Emergency Management
 Department of Premier and Cabinet
 Department of Primary Industries, Parks, Water and Environment
 Department of State Growth
 Department of Treasury and Finance

A range of other agencies support the functions of these departments.

State-owned businesses 
The Government of Tasmania also owns and operates a number of state-owned companies:
 Aurora Energy: electricity and gas retailer.
 Sustainable Timber Tasmania: the manager of public forests and plantations for logging, sawmilling and woodchipping.
 Hydro Tasmania: a large generator of electricity, management of hydroelectric schemes. Also owns a mainland Australian energy retailer, Momentum Energy.
 Tasmanian Irrigation: tasked with the planning, construction and maintenance of the Tasmanian Irrigation Schemes culminating pipes, dams and pumping stations.
 Metro Tasmania: a public transportation company, running busses in the metropolitan areas of the state.
 Motor Accidents Insurance Board (MAIB): public insurance resulting from car accidents.
 Port Arthur Historic Site Management Authority: operates the tourism venture at Port Arthur, maintains the ruins of the gaol and historic site.
 Public Trustee: an independent trustee organisation.
 Tascorp: management of the other public companies' finances and government investment.
 TasRail: rail freight transportation, railway management.
 TasNetworks: electricity transmission and distribution.
 TasPorts: port management and stevedoring.
 Tasracing: the operator of Tasmania's horse and dog racing venues, management of betting.
 TT-Line Company: operates the Bass Strait ferries.

Other levels of government

Federal representation of Tasmania

As a state of Australia, Tasmania is represented in the federal House of Representatives and Senate. Tasmania has five representative in the federal House of Representatives for the electoral divisions of Bass, Braddon, Denison, Franklin, and Lyons. Tasmania also has twelve Senators in line with other states.

Local government in Tasmania

29 local government elections are conducted under the Local Government Act using the Hare-Clark voting system of multi-member proportional representation. Elections for mayor, deputy mayor and half the councillor positions are held during September and October in each uneven numbered year. These include six cities (three in greater Hobart, one covering each of Launceston, Burnie, and Devonport) and twenty-three municipalities. The largest council (by number of eligible voters) is the City of Launceston and the smallest council is the Municipality of Flinders (which serves Flinders Island and the surrounds, with just over 800 electors)

See also

 List of Tasmanian government agencies
 Local government in Tasmania

References

External links
Government of Tasmania website
The Constitution of Tasmania in AustLII (link ineffective)
Constitution Act 1934 (Tas) as enacted

Government of Tasmania